William Lovett may refer to:

William Lovett (1800-1877), British activist
Bill Lovett (1894-1923), Irish American gangster, also known as Wild Bill
Billy Lovett (1894-1965), English footballer for Blackpool and numerous other clubs (see List of Rochdale A.F.C. players (25–99 appearances)